Luis Torres may refer to:

Arts and entertainment
 Luis Lloréns Torres (1876–1944), Puerto Rican poet, playwright, and politician
 Luis Torres Nadal (1943–1986), Puerto Rican playwright, poet and theatrical director
 Luis Torres (musician), DJ with Dzeko & Torres

Explorers
 Luis de Torres (died 1493), Christopher Columbus's interpreter on his first voyage
 Luís Vaz de Torres (c. 1565–c. 1607), Spanish maritime explorer

Politicians
 Luis Vargas Torres (1855–1887), Ecuadorian revolutionary and national hero
 Luis Raúl Torres Cruz (born 1960), Puerto Rican politician

Sportspeople
 Luis Torres (footballer, born 1993), Belizean football forward
 Luis Torres (footballer, born 1952), Paraguayan football midfielder
 Luis Torres (footballer, born 1981), Colombian football defender

See also
 Luis Torres, Sons of Anarchy character
 Louis Torres (born 2001), French football left-back